"The Little Mermaid"  is a literary fairy tale written by the Danish author Hans Christian Andersen, first published in 1837 as part of a collection of fairy tales for children. The story follows the journey of a young mermaid who is willing to give up her life in the sea as a mermaid to gain a human soul.

The original story has been a subject of multiple analyses by scholars such as Jacob Bøggild and Pernille Heegaard, as well as the folklorist Maria Tatar. These analyses cover various aspects of the story, from interpreting the themes to discussing why Andersen chose to write a tragic story with a happy ending. It has been adapted to various media, including musical theatre, anime, ballet, opera, and film. There is also a statue portraying the mermaid in Copenhagen, Denmark, where the story was written and first published.

Plot summary

The Little Mermaid lives in an underwater kingdom with her widowed father (The Sea-King), her dowager grandmother, and her five older sisters, each of whom had been born one year apart.

When a mermaid turns fifteen, she is permitted to swim to the surface for the first time to catch a glimpse of the world above. When the sisters become old enough, each of them visits the upper world one at a time every 365 days. As each returns, the Little Mermaid listens longingly to their various descriptions of the world inhabited by human beings.

When the Little Mermaid's turn comes, she rises up to the surface, watches a birthday celebration being held on a ship in honor of a handsome prince, and falls in love with him from a safe distance. Then a violent storm hits, sinking the ship, and the Little Mermaid saves the prince from drowning. She delivers him unconscious to the shore near a temple. Here, the Little Mermaid waits until a young woman from the temple and her ladies-in-waiting find him. To her dismay, the prince never sees the Little Mermaid or even realizes that it was she who had originally saved his life.

The Little Mermaid becomes melancholy and asks her grandmother if humans can live forever. The grandmother explains that humans have a much shorter lifespan than mermaids (300 years), but that they have an eternal soul that lives on in heaven, while mermaids turn to sea foam at death and cease to exist.

The Little Mermaid, longing for the prince and an eternal soul, visits the Sea Witch who lives in a dangerous part of the ocean. The witch willingly helps her by selling her a potion that gives her legs in exchange for her voice, as the Little Mermaid has the most enchanting voice in the entire world. The witch warns the Little Mermaid that once she becomes a human, she will never be able to return to the sea. Consuming the potion will make her feel as if a sword is being passed through her body. When she recovers, she will have two human legs and will be able to dance like no human has ever danced before; however, she will constantly feel as if she is walking on sharp knives. Moreover, she will obtain a soul only if she wins the love of the prince and marries him, for then a part of his soul will flow into her. Otherwise, at dawn on the first day after he marries someone else, the Little Mermaid will die with a broken heart and dissolve into sea foam upon the waves.
 
After she agrees to the arrangement, the Little Mermaid swims up to the surface near the prince's castle and drinks the potion. The liquid feels like a sword piercing her body and she passes out on the shore, naked. She is found by the prince, who is mesmerized by her beauty and grace, even though he discovers that she is mute. Most of all, he likes to see her dance, and she dances for him despite suffering excruciating pain with every step. Soon, the Little Mermaid becomes the prince's favorite companion and accompanies him on many of his outings—but he does not fall in love with her at all.

When the prince's parents encourage him to marry the neighboring princess in an arranged marriage, the prince tells the Little Mermaid he will not because he does not love the princess. He goes on to say that he can only love the young woman from the temple, who he believes rescued him. It turns out that the princess from the neighboring kingdom was the temple woman, as she was sent to the temple for her education. The prince declares his love for her, and the royal wedding is announced at once.

The prince and princess celebrate their new marriage aboard a wedding ship, and the Little Mermaid's heart breaks. She thinks of all that she has sacrificed and of all the pain she has endured for the prince. She despairs, thinking of the death that awaits her, but before dawn, her sisters rise out of the water and bring her a dagger that the Sea Witch has given them in exchange for their long, beautiful hair. If the Little Mermaid kills the prince and lets his blood drip on her feet, she will become a mermaid once more, all her suffering will end, and she will live out her full life in the ocean with her family. However, the Little Mermaid cannot bring herself to kill the sleeping prince lying with his new wife, and she throws the dagger and herself off the ship into the water just as dawn breaks.

Her body dissolves into foam, but instead of ceasing to exist, she feels the warm sun and discovers that she has turned into a luminous and ethereal earthbound spirit, a daughter of the air. As the Little Mermaid ascends into the atmosphere, she is greeted by other daughters, who tell her she has become like them because she strove with all her heart to obtain an immortal soul. Because of her selflessness, she is given the chance to earn her own soul by doing good deeds for mankind for 300 years, and will one day rise up into Heaven.

Publication
"The Little Mermaid" was written by Hans Christian Andersen in 1836 and first published by C.A. Reitzel in Copenhagen on 7 April 1837 in Fairy Tales Told for Children. First Collection., a collection of nine fairy tales by Andersen.

The story was republished on 18 December 1849 as a part of Fairy Tales. 1850, and again on 15 December 1862 as a part of the first volume of Fairy Tales and Stories.

Critical response

The ending with the mermaid's death and resurrection caused debate and critique. P. L. Travers, author of Mary Poppins and noted folklore commentator, wrote, "This final message is more frightening than any other presented in the tale. The story descends into the Victorian moral tales written for children to scare them into good behavior... Andersen, this is blackmail. And the children know it and say nothing. There's magnanimity for you."

Other scholars like Jacob Bøggild and Pernille Heegaard notice the ending's shift away from tragedy as well. They point out that the events leading up to the mermaid's death should culminate in tragedy, but that the sudden twist allows the narrative to finish on a hopeful success. Bøggild and Heegaard argue that this disjointed ending was not the result of Andersen's sentimentality and religious beliefs, which have been attributed to his choice to stray from the tragic path he established in the rest of the narrative, but a conscious choice for ambiguity that stemmed from Andersen's skepticism towards idealized physical and religious symbols.

However, other critics including Søren Baggesen and James Massengale have argued that the ending is not tacked on, but is a natural part of the story's structure as a religious narrative. The working title of the story was "Daughters of the Air," which are spirits who, as Andersen conceived them, can earn souls by doing three hundred years' worth of good deeds. At the end of the story, one of these spirits explains to the Little Mermaid that they do as many good things for humankind as they are able so that, at the end of those years, they can receive an immortal soul and "take part in the happiness of mankind". The spirits also explain that because the Little Mermaid refused to kill the Prince and has spent so much time in pain while still doing good things for men, she has "raised [herself] to the spirit-world" and can participate in the three hundred years of good deeds alongside the Daughters of the Air.

Andersen was influenced by Undine, another story of a mermaid gaining a soul through marriage, but felt that his ending was an improvement. In 1837, shortly after completing his manuscript, Andersen wrote to a friend, "I have not, like de la Motte Fouqué in Undine, allowed the mermaid's acquiring of an immortal soul to depend upon an alien creature, upon the love of a human being. I'm sure that's wrong! It would depend rather much on chance, wouldn't it? I won't accept that sort of thing in this world. I have permitted my mermaid to follow a more natural, more divine path." Andersen was concerned that the story's meanings would appeal best to adults, but wrote in the foreword to Fairy Tales Told for Children, "I dare presume, however, that the child will also enjoy it and that the denouement itself, plainly considered, will grip the child."

Themes and interpretations
thumb|"'I know what you want' said the sea witch", Engraving by Harry Clarke.
In Maria Tatar's The Annotated Classic Fairy Tales, the transformation of the little mermaid from sea creature to mermaid in human form, and then to a creature of the air, is believed to reflect Andersen's constant engagement with mutability and changes in identity. Tatar also suggests that the Little Mermaid did not give up everything for love alone. Tatar's interpretation of the tale is one that presents a rare heroine with an investigative curiosity which is shown through the mermaid's fascination of the unknown, the forbidden, and her intent on broadening her horizons from the start. Even before she sees the prince, she displays an intense longing to visit the world above the sea through her actions such as: arranging the flowers in her garden into the shape of the sun, listening to her grandmother and sisters' stories of the surface, and peeking in through the window of the prince's cabin during his birthday celebrations. Tatar argues that the mermaid wants, above all, to explore the world and discover things that are beyond what she already knows. The world above seems larger than her own and holds a greater range of possibilities to exercise her adventurous spirit. This is demonstrated in some versions of the story when the prince has a page boy's costume made for her so that she may ride on horseback and explore the land with him. Here, her willingness to cross-dress implies a willingness to transgress gender boundaries and take risks to be able to see the world. Tatar feels this also comments on Andersen's interests in changes in identity.

In her analysis, Virginia Borges concludes that the story contains a message about love and self-sacrifice, and the dangers of accepting abuse or inconsiderate treatment in the name of love.

Susan White interprets the story as the difficult liminal passage of the girl into the order of speech and social symbolism (power, politics, and agency) which is symbolically understood as masculine.

The artist Pen Dalton has made use of Laura Mulvey's interpretation of fetishism in art to link The Little Mermaid to the wearing of fetishistic clothes, and obsessive cosmetic surgery with masculine fears of loss.

Rictor Norton, in My Dear Boy: Gay Love Letters through the Centuries, theorizes that The Little Mermaid was written as a love letter by Hans Christian Andersen to Edvard Collin. This is based on a letter Andersen wrote to Collin, upon hearing of Collin's engagement to a young woman, around the same time that the Little Mermaid was written. Andersen wrote "I languish for you as for a pretty Calabrian wench... my sentiments for you are those of a woman. The femininity of my nature and our friendship must remain a mystery." Andersen also sent the original story to Collin. Norton interprets the correspondence as a declaration of Andersen's homosexual love for Collin, and describes The Little Mermaid as an allegory for Andersen's life.

Adaptations

NBC television show

In 1958, NBC began airing a new television show titled Shirley Temple's Storybook, an American children's anthology series that was hosted and narrated by actress Shirley Temple. The series features adaptations of fairy tales like Mother Goose and other family-oriented stories performed by well-known actors. The first season of sixteen black-and-white and colored episodes aired on NBC between 12 January 1958, and 21 December 1958, as Shirley Temple's Storybook. Thirteen episodes of the first season re-ran on ABC beginning on 12 January 1959. The second season of twenty-five color episodes aired on NBC as The Shirley Temple Show between 18 September 1960, and 16 July 1961 in much the same format that it had under its original title.

The show aired their adaptation of The Little Mermaid on 5 March 1961 as episode 22 during the show's second season. Shirley Temple herself played the mermaid. Unlike the original story, the mermaid does not give up her voice to become human, but she still fails to win the prince's heart when he falls in love with the princess who found him. In the end, when she cannot bring herself to kill the prince with the dagger, she prepares to throw herself into the sea. Neptune himself intervenes and says that for her selfless act, she has earned the right to become a mermaid again and rejoin her family, giving the story a happy ending.

Soviet feature film

This 1976 Russian feature film was directed by Vladimir Bychkov and starred Viktoriya Novikova as the mermaid. The story is set in the 13th century. The mermaid saves the prince from drowning, after other mermaids mesmerize the sailors into crashing their ship on to the rocks. The prince is saved by a local princess under whose care he recovers. The mermaid seeks to marry the prince. A traveling handyman tries to help the mermaid in her love. He finds a local witch who changes her tail into legs in exchange for her hair. The prince marries the local princess and the mermaid is destined to die on the same day. The traveling handyman challenges the prince to a fight and is killed. His sacrifice spares the mermaid from death and her soul becomes eternal.

Disney's animated film
 Disney's The Little Mermaid is a 1989 American animated musical fantasy romance film produced by Walt Disney Feature Animation and distributed by Buena Vista Pictures Distribution. Loosely based on the original tale, the 1989 Disney film tells the story of a mermaid princess named Ariel, who dreams of becoming human, especially after falling in love with a human prince named Eric. Written, produced, and directed by Ron Clements and John Musker, with music by Alan Menken and Howard Ashman (who also served as a co-producer), the film features the voices of Jodi Benson, Christopher Daniel Barnes, and Pat Carroll among others.

The Little Mermaid was originally planned as part of one of Walt Disney's earliest feature films, a proposed package film featuring vignettes of Hans Christian Andersen tales. Development started in the late 1930s but was delayed due to various circumstances. In 1985, Ron Clements became interested in a film adaptation of The Little Mermaid while he was serving as a director on The Great Mouse Detective (1986). Clements discovered the Hans Christian Andersen fairy tale while browsing through a bookstore. Believing the story provided an "ideal basis" for an animated feature film and keen on creating a film that took place underwater, Clements wrote and presented a two-page treatment of Mermaid to Disney CEO Jeffrey Katzenberg, who approved of the idea for possible development the next day. While in production in the 1980s, the staff by chance found the original story and visual development work done by Kay Nielsen for Disney's proposed 1930s Andersen feature. Many of the changes made by the staff in the 1930s to Hans Christian Andersen's original story were coincidentally the same as the changes made by Disney writers in the 1980s.

Pop culture

The Little Mermaid statue

A statue of The Little Mermaid sits on a rock in the Copenhagen harbor in Langelinie. This small and unimposing statue is a Copenhagen icon and a major tourist attraction.

The statue was commissioned in 1909 by Carl Jacobsen, son of the founder of Carlsberg, after he had been fascinated by a ballet based on the fairy tale. The sculptor Edward Eriksen created the statue, which was unveiled on 23 August 1913. His wife, Eline Eriksen, was the model for the body. Ellen Price, the ballerina who danced the Little Mermaid in the 1909 Royal Danish Ballet production, was the model for the head and face. The statue has been severely vandalized several times.

In May 2010, it was moved from its Copenhagen harbor emplacement for the first time ever, for transport to Expo 2010 in Shanghai, where it remained until 20 November 2010.

The Little Mermaid statue in the Principality of Monaco
A statue of The Little Mermaid looks out over Larvotto beach in Monaco. She was created in 2000 by Kristian Dahlgard, with several layers of metal, in homage to the Danes who live in Monaco and for the late Prince Rainier III to mark the 50th year of his reign.

See also
Mermaids in popular culture

References

External links

 The Little Mermaid Gallery
 See photos of The Little Mermaid
 "The Little Mermaid", Jean Hersholt's English translation
 Den lille Havfrue, original Danish text from the Danish Royal Library
 Den lille havfrue, original manuscript (Odense City Museum)
 Surlalune: Annotated "The Little Mermaid", Paull's translation, with annotations, scans from six illustrated editions, and bibliography
 

1837 short stories
Short stories by Hans Christian Andersen
Fiction about mermaids
Fiction about shapeshifting
Danish Culture Canon
Witchcraft in fairy tales
Works based on folklore
Danish fairy tales
False hero